Scientology is a body of beliefs and related practices created by science fiction writer L. Ron Hubbard. The word also refers to the Church of Scientology which claims a monopoly over Scientology services.

Scientology may also refer to:
Scientology: A History of Man, 1952 book by L. Ron Hubbard 
Scientology: The Now Religion, 1970 book by George Malko
Scientology (James R. Lewis book), 2009 book edited by James R. Lewis